Janalibandali is a market center in Mangalsen municipality in Achham District in the Seti Zone of western Nepal. The municipality was established merging with existing Janalibandali, Kuntibandali, Oligau, Jupu and Mangalsen village development committees (VDCs) on 18 May 2014. At the time of the 2001 Nepal census, the population was 2,913, of whom 22% were literate.

References

Populated places in Achham District